The Complete Commodore & Decca Masters is a 3CD box set of recordings by Billie Holiday, released by Hip-O Records in 2009, compiling all the master takes released as 78rpm singles by Commodore and Decca Records. It includes an essay by Ashley Kahn.

Content
In 1939, Columbia Records refused to let Billie Holiday record the anti-lynching protest song "Strange Fruit". Milt Gabler invited her to record it for his small specialty label Commodore Records, and Columbia granted her a one-time exemption from her contract to do so, in which she recorded four songs (material for two 78rpm records). "Strange Fruit", backed with "Fine and Mellow", turned out to be the biggest selling record of her career. Although she continued to record for Columbia, in 1944, following the musicians' strike recording ban, Holiday permanently left Columbia for Commodore. Small labels like Commodore had been quicker to settle with the musician's union than large labels like Columbia, thus Holiday was able to return to recording quicker by switching to the smaller label. The Commodore tracks were more dominated by torch songs and dramatic ballads than her swing oriented Columbia material had been, although her later Columbia sides  (e.g. "God Bless the Child") show she had already been evolving in this direction.

Later the same year, Holiday then followed Gabler to Decca Records, to record "Lover Man". Decca had allowed Gabler to keep his own label, while also being employed by them, so long as he directed all potential hits to Decca. Both Holiday and Gabler suspected "Lover Man" had the potential to be a hit, thus it became her first Decca single, and indeed another of her biggest hits. "Lover Man" was notable for featuring a string section, and all her Decca tracks typically featured string arrangements and even choral backing, rather than jazz combos. This was Holiday's choice, as strings were often used in the white pop records of the day, and when she recorded "Lover Man" she wanted the same sound offered to artists like Bing Crosby, and specifically her friend Frank Sinatra. During this same period, Holiday began performing in concert halls rather than nightclubs, and her live performances became more theatrical than jazz, with many of these dramatic songs becoming centrepieces of her set.  Holiday continued to record for Decca throughout the 1940s, before again switching to Norman Granz's Clef label (later Verve) in the next decade.

The orchestras Holiday recorded with while at Commodore and Decca were variously led by Toots Camarata, Bob Haggart, Bill Stegmeyer, John Simmons, Buster Harding, Sy Oliver, and Gordon Jenkins.

"Big Stuff" was a Leonard Bernstein single, with Billie doing a new vocal to a song Bernstein had written as the prologue to his 1944 ballet Fancy Free. The b-side was another Bernstein song from the ballet, without Holiday: "Fancy Free (Galop Variation And Finale)" performed by the Ballet Theatre Orchestra Under Direction of Leonard Bernstein.

"You Can't Lose A Broken Heart" and "My Sweet Hunk O' Trash" were collaborations with Louis Armstrong.

"Guilty" was the only track not originally released as a 78rpm record, first appearing on the much later compilation LP The Blues Are Brewin' (Decca – DL 8701) in 1958.

Track listing

Disc One: The Commodore Recordings

Disc Two: The Decca Recordings

Disc Three: The Decca Recordings Continued

Billie Holiday's Commodore and Decca recordings have been compiled many times, beginning with 78rpm albums in the 1940s and then 10 inch vinyl LPs. Some compilations also include many alternate takes of the songs, but only the master takes originally released as 78rpm singles are included in this set.

Personnel
Contributing musicians, in chronological order.
 Billie Holiday: vocals
 Frank Newton: trumpet (cd1 tracks 1–4)
 Tab Smith: soprano, alto sax (cd1 tracks 1–4)
 Kenneth Hollon: tenor sax (cd1 tracks 1–4)
 Stanley Payne: tenor sax (cd1 tracks 1–4)
 Sonny White: piano (cd1 tracks 1–4)
 Jimmy McLin: guitar (cd1 tracks 1–4)
 John Williams: bass (cd1 tracks 1–4)
 Eddie Dougherty: drums (cd1 tracks 1–4)
 Doc Cheatham: trumpet (cd1 tracks 5–12)
 Vic Dickenson: trombone (cd1 tracks 5–12)
 Lem Davis: alto sax (cd1 tracks 5–12, cd2 tracks 12–13)
 Eddie Heywood: piano, arranger (cd1 tracks 5–16)
 Teddy Walters: guitar (cd1 tracks 5–8)
 John Simmons: bass (cd1 tracks 5–16, cd2 tracks 7–8, 12–13), conductor (cd2 tracks 12–13)
 Sid Catlett: drums (cd1 tracks 5–16, cd2 tracks 7–8)
 Russ Case: trumpet (cd2 tracks 1–3)
 Jack Cressey: alto sax (cd2 tracks 1–3)
 Hymie Schertzer: alto sax (cd2 tracks 1–3)
 Larry Binyon: tenor sax (cd2 tracks 1–3)
 Paul Ricci: tenor sax (cd2 tracks 1–2)
 Dave Bowman: piano (cd2 tracks 1–3)
 Carl Kress: guitar (cd2 tracks 1–3)
 Haig Stephens: bass (cd2 tracks 1–3)
 Johnny Blowers: drums (cd2 tracks 1–2)
 Toots Camarata: conductor (cd2 tracks 1–3)
 Dave Harris: tenor saxophone (cd2 track 3)
 George Wettling: drums (cd2 track 3)
 Joe Guy: trumpet (cd2 tracks 4–11)
 Bill Stegmeyer: alto sax (cd2 tracks 4–8, 14–17), conductor (cd2 tracks 7–8), clarinet (cd2 tracks 14–17)
 Armand Camgros: tenor sax (cd2 tracks 4–8)
 Hank Ross: tenor saxophone (cd2 tracks 4–8, 14–17)
 Stan Webb: baritone sax (cd2 tracks 4–6)
 Sammy Benskin: piano (cd2 tracks 4–6)
 Tiny Grimes: guitar (cd2 tracks 4–9)
 Bob Haggart: bass, conductor (cd2 tracks 4–6, 14–17)
 Specs Powell: drums (cd2 tracks 4–6)
 Chris Griffin: trumpet (cd2 tracks 7–8)
 Bernard Kaufman: tenor sax (cd2 tracks 7–8)
 Joe Springer: piano (cd2 tracks 7–9)
 Billy Taylor: bass (cd2 track 9)
 Kelly Martin: drums(cd2 track 9)
 Billy Kyle: piano (cd2 tracks 10–11, cd3 tracks 9-11)
 Jimmy Shirley: guitar (cd2 tracks 10–11)
 Thomas Barney: bass (cd2 tracks 10–11)
 Kenny Clarke: drums (cd2 tracks 10–11)
 Rostelle Reese: trumpet (cd2 tracks 12–13)
 Bob Dorsey: tenor sax (cd2 tracks 12–13)
 Bobby Tucker: piano (cd2 tracks 12–19, cd3 tracks 1–2)
 Denzil Best: drums (cd2 tracks 12–13, 18–19, cd3 tracks 1–2)
 Billy Butterfield: trumpet (cd2 tracks 14–17)
 Al Klink: alto sax (cd2 tracks 14–17)
 Toots Mondello: alto sax (cd2 tracks 14–17)
 Art Drellinger: tenor sax (cd2 tracks 14–17, cd3 tracks 9-11)
 Dan Perry: guitar (cd2 tracks 14–17)
 Bunny Shawker: drums (cd2 tracks 14–17, cd3 tracks 12–15)
 Mundell Lowe: guitar (cd2 tracks 18–19, cd3 tracks 1–2)
 John Levy: bass (cd2 tracks 18–19, cd3 tracks 1–2)
 Emmett Berry: trumpet (cd3 tracks 3–4)
 Buck Clayton: trumpet (cd3 tracks 3–4, 7–8)
 Jimmy Nottingham: trumpet (cd3 tracks 3–4)
 George Matthews: trombone (cd3 tracks 3–4)
 Dicky Wells: trombone (cd3 tracks 3–4)
 George Dorsey: alto sax (cd3 tracks 3–8)
 Rudy Powell: alto sax (cd3 tracks 3–4)
 Joe Thomas: tenor sax (cd3 tracks 3–4)
 Lester Young: tenor sax (cd3 tracks 3–4)
 Sol Moore: baritone sax (cd3 tracks 3–4)
 Horace Henderson: piano (cd3 tracks 3–8)
 Mundell Lowe: guitar (cd3 tracks 3–4)
 George Duvivier: bass (cd3 tracks 3–6)
 Shadow Wilson: drums (cd3 tracks 3–4)
 Buster Harding: conductor (cd3 tracks 3–4)
 Tony Faso: trumpet (cd3 tracks 5–6)
 Bernie Privin: trumpet (cd3 tracks 5–6, 9–11))
 Dick Vance: trumpet (cd3 tracks 5–6)
 Mort Bullman: trombone (cd3 tracks 5–6)
 Henderson Chambers: trombone (cd3 tracks 5–8)
 Johnny Mince: alto sax (cd3 tracks 5–6, 9–11)
 Budd Johnson: tenor sax (cd3 tracks 5–8)
 Freddie Williams: tenor sax (cd3 tracks 5–8)
 Eddie Barefield: baritone saxophone, clarinet (cd3 tracks 5–6)
 Everett Barksdale: guitar (cd3 tracks 5–11)
 Cozy Cole: drums (cd3 tracks 5–6)
 Sy Oliver: conductor (cd3 tracks 5–11)
 Lester "Shad" Collins: trumpet (cd3 tracks 7–8)
 Bobby Williams: trumpet (cd3 tracks 7–8)
 George Stevenson: trombone (cd3 tracks 7–8)
 Pete Clark: alto sax (cd3 tracks 7–8)
 Dave McRae: baritone sax (cd3 tracks 7–8)
 Joe Benjamin: bass (cd3 tracks 7–11)
 Wallace Bishop: drums (cd3 tracks 7–8)
 Sid Cooper: alto sax (cd3 tracks 9-11)
 Pat Nizza: tenor sax (cd3 tracks 9-11)
 Jimmy Crawford: drums (cd3 tracks 9-11)
 Louis Armstrong: vocals (cd3 tracks 9–10)
 Gordon Jenkins & His Orchestra: strings (cd3 tracks 12–17)
 Bobby Hackett: trumpet (cd3 tracks 12–15)
 Milt Yaner: clarinet, alto sax (cd3 tracks 12–15)
 John Fulton: clarinet, flute, tenor sax (cd3 tracks 12–15)
 Bernie Leighton: piano (cd3 tracks 12–15)
 Tony Mottola: guitar (cd3 tracks 12–15)
 Jack Lesberg: bass (cd3 tracks 12–15)
 Dick "Dent" Eckles: flute, tenor sax (cd3 tracks 16–17)
 Charlie LaVere: piano (cd3 tracks 16–17)
 Bob Bain: guitar (cd3 tracks 16–17)
 Lou Butterman: bass (cd3 tracks 16–17)
 Nick Fatool: drums (cd3 tracks 16–17)
 Gordon Jenkins Singers: background vocals (cd3 tracks 16–17)

References

Billie Holiday albums